Diwan Bahadur Sakkottai Krishnaswamy Aiyangar  (15 April 1871 – 26 November 1946) was an Indian historian, academician and Dravidologist. He chaired the Department of Indian History and Archaeology at the University of Madras from 1914 to 1929.

Krishnaswamy Aiyangar was born in a village near Kumbakonam in 1871. He did his education in Madras and worked as a lecturer in Bangalore from 1899 to 1909. In 1914, he was made head of the department of Indian history and archaeology at the University of Madras, and held this post from 1914 to 1929. Krishnaswamy Aiyangar died in 1946 at the age of 76.

Aiyangar was elected a member of the Royal Asiatic Society in 1908 and was conferred a Diwan Bahadur title in 1928. He is known for the new methods he introduced in interpreting the history of Vijayanagar. His historical methodology is considered to be Indian nationalistic.

Early life and education 
Krishnaswamy Aiyangar was born in a Tamil brahmin family at village of Sakkottai near Kumbakonam on 15 April 1871. At the age of eleven, he lost his father. He had his schooling in Kumbakonam and graduated in history from the University of Madras in 1897. In 1899, he obtained his M. A. from the University of Madras and taught as a lecturer at the Central College of Bangalore from 1899 to 1909.

Early career 
In 1904, he was elected fellow of the Royal Asiatic Society. He was awarded an honorary PhD by the University of Calcutta. In 1928, the title of Diwan Bahadur was bestowed upon him.

Head of Department of Indian History and Archaeology 
In 1914, the University of Madras appointed Krishnaswamy Aiyangar to the chair of the department of Indian history and archaeology. Aiyangar headed the department till 1929. At about the same time, Aiyangar took over a struggling periodical called Journal of Indian History which was started by Shafaat Ahmed Khan in 1921. Aiyangar faced financial difficulties in the beginning but rescued the journal by persuading the University of Kerala to take over the magazine. By the time the university had taken over the magazine Aiyangar had already established the journal as one of the premium history magazines in the world.

Krishnaswamy Aiyangar was succeeded by K. A. Nilakanta Sastri to the chair of the Department of Indian History and Archaeology in 1929.

Methodology 
Krishnaswamy Aiyangar assisted Robert Sewell in his analyses of the epigraphy and archaeology of South India. These publications inspired Aiyangar to make a detailed enquiry into the history of Vijayanagar and by the 1920s, he had published a set of masterpieces on the history of Vijayanagar. His historical methodology was, however, a marked deviation from that of Sewell's and historians who had lived before him. His books devoted more attention to the Hindu-Muslim conflicts that shaped the history of Vijayanagar. In his 1921-book Ancient India, Aiyangar states that the Hoysala king Veera Ballala III "made a patriotic effort to dislodge the Muhammadans from the South... fell in the effort, and brought his dynasty to an end in carrying on this great national war of the Hindus". His views were echoed by Kannadiga historian B. A. Saletore and Telugu historian N. Venkatramanayya.

Works

References 

1871 births
1946 deaths
19th-century Indian historians
Dravidologists
People from Thanjavur district
University of Madras alumni
Academic staff of the University of Madras
Scientists from Tamil Nadu
Fellows of the Royal Asiatic Society
Dewan Bahadurs
20th-century Indian historians
People from British India